The FlyNano Nano is a Finnish electric single seat seaplane, designed by Aki Suokas and produced by FlyNano of Lahti. It was introduced at AERO Friedrichshafen in 2011 and the prototype Proto version first flew on 11 June 2012. When it was available the aircraft was supplied as a complete ready-to-fly-aircraft.

By 2022 the company website domain was for sale and it is likely that the company ceased operations in about 2020.

Design and development
The aircraft was designed to comply with the EC 216/2008 Annex 2 (j) rules for deregulated class under 70 kg (154 lb) empty weight. It features a joined wing box wing, a single-seat open cockpit without a windshield, a hull for water operations, but no wheeled landing gear and a single electric engine in tractor configuration mounted above the cockpit.

The aircraft is made from carbon fibre. Its  span wing has no flaps. The initial plan was to produce several models with different powerplant options, including a two-stroke powered ultralight, a high-powered racing model and an electric model. The company has more recently announced that only the electric model will be produced, citing that "it's quiet, efficient, eco-friendly and it's easy to maintain". The aircraft wing can be removed for storage or ground transportation.

Specifications (Nano)

References

External links
Official website archives on Archive.org
First flight official video on Archive.org

2010s Finnish ultralight aircraft
Electric aircraft
Single-engined tractor aircraft